(sometimes stylized as AOKI takamasa)  (born 1976), is a Japanese electronic musician and producer.

Biography 

Aoki Takamasa was born in Osaka in 1976. He began experimenting as a musician in 1993 when he was 17, when he recorded music on a four-track cassette recorder, mixing acoustic guitar, bass and drums together. He continued to experiment with electronic music, and in 2001 he released his first album Silicom through the independent Japanese label Progressive Form. He released a further three albums with Progressive Form until 2004, and one on musician Yoshihiro Hanno's personal label, Cirque Records, in 2003. In 2004 he relocated from Osaka to France, to work with singer Tujiko Noriko to create the album 28 while there. Aoki originally began collaborating with Tujiko in 2002, when the pair collaborated musically by sending CDs in the mail between Osaka and Paris, where Tujiko was based, and decided to move there to further the project.

Aoki based himself in Paris for four years, later moving to Berlin for three. In 2011, he returned to Japan, and based his musical career in Osaka again. During his time in Europe, Aoki released the albums Parabolica (2006) and Private Party (2008) in Japan, and also released music with the European music labels Raster-Noton, Stroboscopic Artefacts and Svakt.

Since returning to Osaka, Aoki has released RV8 (2013), his first release to chart in Japan. Since 2013, Aoki has often collaborated with the band Sakanaction. He co-wrote two of the songs from the band's album Sakanaction: "Inori" and "Structure", had remixed several of the band's songs, and has performed at events organized by the band's personal label, NF Records. In January 2016, Aoki released Reflects, a collaboration with Sakanaction member Ichiro Yamaguchi, featuring music they co-composed for the fashion brand Anrealage's show for Paris Fashion Week.

In addition to being a musician, Aoki spends much of his time as an amateur photographer.

Discography

Albums

Studio albums

Live albums

Remix albums

Extended plays

References

External links 

 
 Official myspace site

1976 births
FatCat Records artists
Japanese electronic musicians
Japanese male musicians
Living people
Musicians from Osaka Prefecture